McCullough is a surname of Irish origin. It is the anglicized form of the Gaelic Mac Cú Uladh which means “son of the Hound of Ulster”. It may also be a variation of the Scottish McCulloch.

People with the surname McCullough:

 Alfred McCullough (born 1989), American football player
 Alison McCullough, British speech and language therapist
 Andrew McCullough (born 1990), Australian Rugby League player
 Bernie Mac (born Bernard Jeffrey McCullough, 1957–2008), American comedian and actor 
 Billy McCullough (born 1935), Northern Ireland footballer
 Brian McCullough (born 1985), American college baseball coach
 Clayton McCullough (born 1979), American baseball coach
 Clyde McCullough (1917–1982), Irish baseball player
 Colleen McCullough (1937–2015), Australian author
 Conde McCullough (1887–1946), American bridge engineer
 David McCullough (1933–2022), American historian and author 
 Denis McCullough (1883–1968), Irish rebel in the early 20th century
 Donald McCullough (disambiguation), several people
 Douglas McCullough, American judge
 Ellen McCullough (1908 or 1909–1985), British trade unionist
 Esther Morgan McCullough (1888–1957), American author
 Frank S. McCullough (1905–1998), New York politician and judge
 Frisby McCullough (1828-1862), Confederate officer executed during the American Civil War
 George McCullough (born 1975), American football player
 Helen Craig McCullough (1918–1998), American scholar of classical Japanese poetry and prose
 Henry McCullough (1943–2016), Northern Irish musician
 Henry M. McCullough (1858–1930), American politician and lawyer
 Hiram McCullough (1813–1885), U.S. Congressman from Maryland
 J. McCullough, Scottish author and avid golfer of the late 19th century
 James McCullough (disambiguation), several people
 John McCullough (disambiguation), several people
 Joy McCullough, American author
 Julie McCullough (born 1965), American model and actress
 Kimberly McCullough (born 1978), American actress
 Liam McCullough (born 1997), American football player
 Louis McCullough, American basketball player
 Luke McCullough (born 1994), Irish footballer
 Michael McCullough (entrepreneur) (born 1966), American social entrepreneur, investor and physician
 Michael McCullough (psychologist) (born 1969), American psychologist and author
 Mike McCullough (disambiguation), several people
 Naida McCullough (c.1901–1989), American educator, pianist, and composer
 Paul McCullough (1883–1936), American actor and comedian
 Paul McCullough (baseball) (1898–1970), American baseball pitcher
 Paul McCullough (footballer) (born 1959), English football goalkeeper
 Peter McCullough (disambiguation), several people
 Robert McCullough (disambiguation), several people
 Saladin McCullough (born 1975), American football player
 Shanna McCullough (born 1960), American adult film star
 Suli McCullough (born 1968), American comic-actor and writer
 Sultan McCullough (born 1980), National Football League running back
 Wayne McCullough (born 1970), Northern Irish boxer
 William McCullough (disambiguation), several people

See also 
McCullagh
Clan MacCulloch
McCulloch
Cú Chulainn